Alexander Miller may refer to:

Alexander Miller (theologian) (1908–1960), Scottish-born cosmopolitan writer
Alexander Kennedy Miller (1906–1993), American collector
Alexander Miller (composer) (born 1968), American composer
Alexander Miller (merchant), Scottish merchant
Alexander Miller (tailor) (1559-1616), Scottish tailor to James VI
Alex Miller (born 1949), Scottish association football player and manager
Alex Miller (1890s footballer) (fl. 1888–1898), Scottish footballer
Alex Miller (writer) (born 1936), Australian novelist
Alex Miller (politician) (born 1977), member of the Knesset for Yisrael Beiteinu
Alex Miller (lobbyist) (1922–1998), political lobbyist in Alaska
Alex Miller (died 1965), better known as Sonny Boy Williamson II, American blues musician

See also
Alex Millar (born 1985), British professional poker player
Alex Millar (Being Human), fictional television character
Sandy Millar (born 1939), Anglican bishop